White-breasted hedgehog may refer to:
 Northern white-breasted hedgehog (Erinaceus roumanicus), a hedgehog domestic between Eastern Europe and Western Siberian
 Southern white-breasted hedgehog (Erinaceus concolor), a hedgehog of Western Asia

Animal common name disambiguation pages